Abu'l-Khattar al-Husam ibn Darar al-Kalbi was Umayyad governor of Al-Andalus from May 743 until August 745. He was succeeded by Tuwaba ibn Salama al-Gudami. Whilst governor he was ordered by the caliph Hisham ibn Abd al-Malik to restore lands to Sara al-Qutiyya that had been appropriated by her uncle.

He was taken prisoner by the Ma'addites at the Battle of Secunda in 747 whilst trying to re-assert his right to rule against the challenge of Yusuf ibn 'Abd al-Rahman al-Fihri.

See also

Timeline of the Muslim presence in the Iberian peninsula

References

Year of birth missing
8th-century rulers in Europe
Umayyad governors of Al-Andalus
Prisoners of war
Banu Kalb
745 deaths
8th-century Arabs